Richard Guay is a New York City based American film producer.

His productions include True Love (1989)  which won the Grand Jury Prize at the 1989 Sundance Film Festival, Dogfight (1991), Ghost Dog: The Way of the Samurai (1999), Kinsey (2004), and Shutter (2008).

He has been married to Nancy Savoca since 1980, and they have three children.

References

External links
 

American film producers
Living people
Year of birth missing (living people)